= Drunken Gulch =

Valley in Mariposa County, California, United States

Coordinates: 37.578°N 120.072°W

Drunken Gulch is a valley in Mariposa County, California, in the United States.

Drunken Gulch was likely named by prospectors during or after the California Gold Rush.
